Qabeit, Qabaait,  Kabiit,   is a village in Akkar Governorate, Lebanon. The population is Sunni Muslims.

History
The town mourned the death of 17 people  connected to the area who drowned while trying to reach Australia by makeshift boat in September 2012. Qabeit is in one of the poorest parts of Lebanon and is part of a region that has received hundreds of thousands of Syrian refugees during the Syrian Civil War.

References

External links
Qabaait, Localiban 

Populated places in Akkar District
Sunni Muslim communities in Lebanon